Louise Pope may refer to:

 Louise Kink (1908–1992), later Pope, one of the last remaining survivors of the sinking of the RMS Titanic
 Louise Josephine Pope, American painter